Arthur Mallwitz (15 June 1880 – 20 May 1968) was a German athlete. He competed in the men's standing long jump and the men's standing high jump events at the 1908 Summer Olympics.

References

1880 births
1968 deaths
Athletes from Berlin
Athletes (track and field) at the 1906 Intercalated Games
Athletes (track and field) at the 1908 Summer Olympics
German male high jumpers
German male long jumpers
Olympic athletes of Germany